Montecarotto is a comune (municipality) in the Province of Ancona in the Italian region Marche, located about  west of Ancona, mostly known internationally for the annual Blackmoon festival, a renowned goa and psytrance happening.

Montecarotto borders the following municipalities: Arcevia, Belvedere Ostrense, Ostra, Ostra Vetere, Poggio San Marcello, Rosora, Serra de' Conti.

Demographic evolution

See also
 Mail art

References

Gallery

External links

Official Site
Marche Tourism site

Cities and towns in the Marche